Animoog is a music synth mobile app designed for iPad, iPhone and BlackBerry Z10. Animoog is powered by Moog Music's Anisotropic Synthesis Engine.

Description 
There are three versions of Animoog. Animoog for the iPad is simply named 'Animoog'. 'Animoog for iPhone', which offers different features and layout, works on iPhones and the iPod Touch. There also is a third version named 'Animoog for Blackberry', built for the BlackBerry Z10.

Animoog comes with tens of varied sound presets. Over 3,100 Animoog presets and 5,100 timbres are also available through official and user-provided expansion packs. Expansion packs include work from acclaimed sound designers, such as Richard Devine, Drew Neumann, Sascha Dikiciyan and Adam Holzman. A set of 82 official presets, available as in-app purchase, are derived from a 1968 live recording of the Grateful Dead's Anthem of the Sun album.

Animoog won a TEC award in early 2013 with the mention of being "Expressive, Captivating and Sonically Immersive".

Animoog is also the sound engine at the core of the Theremini, a modern theremin built by Moog.

See also 

 Moog synthesizer
 Moogfest's Animoog Playground

References

External links
 Animoog product page from Moog Music site
 Animoog.org, community-oriented Animoog website
 Official Moog Apps forum

Moog synthesizers
IOS software
BlackBerry software
Software synthesizers